Nolima is a genus of mantidflies in the family Mantispidae. There are about seven described species in Nolima.

Species
These seven species belong to the genus Nolima:
 Nolima dine Rehn, 1939
 Nolima infensa Navás, 1924
 Nolima kantsi Rehn, 1939
 Nolima pinal Rehn, 1939
 Nolima praeliator Navás, 1914
 Nolima pugnax (Navás, 1914)
 Nolima victor Navás, 1914

References

Further reading

 
 
 

Hemerobiiformia
Articles created by Qbugbot